Corey Peters (born June 8, 1988) is an American football nose tackle for the Jacksonville Jaguars of the National Football League (NFL). He was drafted by the Atlanta Falcons in the third round of the 2010 NFL Draft. He played college football at Kentucky.

Early years
Peters played high school football for Louisville Central High School, where he was first-team all state.

College career
Peters played college football at Kentucky.  He started two games as a freshman and started 12 games as a sophomore.   As a junior, he tallied 36 tackles, 10 tackles for loss and four quarterback sacks.  As a senior Peters had four sacks and twelve tackles for losses.  Peters was also named second-team All-SEC as a senior.

Professional career

Atlanta Falcons
Peters was drafted by the Atlanta Falcons in the third round, 83rd overall, of the 2010 NFL Draft. The Atlanta Falcons signed Corey Peters to a four-year deal on June 8, 2010.

On March 4, 2014, Peters and the Falcons agreed on a one-year deal that kept him in Atlanta throughout the 2014 season.

Arizona Cardinals
On March 10, 2015, Peters signed a three-year deal with the Arizona Cardinals. He tore his left Achilles tendon on August 20, 2015 during practice, and was placed on injured reserve the next day.

On December 1, 2017, Peters signed a three-year contract extension with the Cardinals.

In 2018, Peters started 15 games, recording a career-high 51 tackles and 2.5 sacks.

In Week 10 of the 2020 season, Peters suffered a season-ending knee injury and was placed on injured reserve on November 19, 2020.

On August 2, 2021, Peters signed a one-year deal with the Cardinals.

Jacksonville Jaguars
On September 12, 2022, Peters signed with the practice squad of the Jacksonville Jaguars. He was promoted to the active roster on October 12.

NFL statistics

Key
 GP: games played
 COMB: combined tackles
 TOTAL: total tackles
 AST: assisted tackles
 SACK: sacks
 FF: forced fumbles
 FR: fumble recoveries
 FR YDS: fumble return yards 
 INT: interceptions
 IR YDS: interception return yards
 AVG IR: average interception return
 LNG: longest interception return
 TD: interceptions returned for touchdown
 PD: passes defensed

References

External links
Arizona Cardinals bio
Kentucky Wildcats bio

1988 births
Living people
American football defensive tackles
American football defensive ends
Arizona Cardinals players
Atlanta Falcons players
Central High School (Louisville, Kentucky) alumni
Ed Block Courage Award recipients
Jacksonville Jaguars players
Kentucky Wildcats football players
Players of American football from Pittsburgh